Mardochée Valabrègue ( – ) was a French soldier and the successor of Général Alexandre Percin as Chief of Staff for Minister of War Louis André.

Biography
Valabrègue was born in 1852 in Carpentras to Isaac Valabrègue and Debora Elodie Mendez. He was admitted to the École polytechnique in 1871, training for the artillery. In 1878, he served with the 23rd Artillery Region and became in charge of the manufacture of munitions in Tulle.

He became Captain in 1878 and Officer of Ordnance for Minister of War Georges Boulanger in 1886. A brilliant officer of the general staff, he was noted in 1895 as being "of exceptional intelligence, perfect conduct in service, well-honed knowledge both military and general, great aptitude for service in the general staff... such as these are in the resume of the qualities of [Valabrègue]." Later, when he was publicly Jewish, Pierre Rocolle wrote that "there is nothing which proves the claim of the anti-Semites that there was a correlation between the Dreyfuss affair and the flattering promotions which... they received."

Promoted to squadron leader in 1889, he became Colonel in 1902, when he was commander of the École d'application de l'artillerie et du génie. In 1903 he became chief of staff for the 11th Artillery Regiment, where he was appreciated enough to be named chief of staff for General André in 1904, then Maurice Berteaux in 1905. He was named Brigadier General in 1905, commander of the École de Guerre in 1907, Divisional General in 1908, commander of the 12th Infantry Division and of the garrison at Reims from October 10, 1908 to March 14, 1911, commander of the 3rd Army Corps in 1911, and finally member of the Conseil Supérieur de la Guerre in 1914, when Joffre was Chief of Staff.

At the onset of the First World War, he commanded a group of reserve divisions in the Fifth Army of General Charles Lanrezac. Valabrègue's divisions were dissolved on September 30, 1914, when Lanrezac was sacked by Joffre. He then became inspector for camps and infantry depots until 1917, when he retired into the reserves.

He died on March 26, 1934 in Paris.

Sources
Bruno Besnier, L'affaire des fiches : un système d'État (1900-1914), La Roche-sur-Yon : Master I d'histoire, 2005.
Serge Doessant, Le général André, de l'affaire Dreyfus à l'affaire des fiches, Editions Glyphe, Paris, 2009, 416 p.

References

1852 births
1934 deaths
École Polytechnique alumni
French generals
19th-century French Jews
Grand Officiers of the Légion d'honneur
People from Carpentras
Recipients of the Order of the Dragon of Annam
Recipients of the Order of the Rising Sun